Heracleustibus was a populated place, a station in the Jerusalem Itinerary, 11 M. P. from Apollonia in Mygdonia.  has conjectured that it is equivalent to Ἡρακλέους στίβος. The name comes down to us also in the form of Heracleustes.

The site of Heracleustibus is near the modern Konios.

References

Populated places in ancient Macedonia
Former populated places in Greece